Year 1027 (MXXVII) was a common year starting on Sunday (link will display the full calendar) of the Julian calendar.

Events 
 By Place 

 Europe 
 March 26 – Pope John XIX crowns Conrad II ("the Elder") and his wife Gisela of Swabia as Holy Roman Emperor and Empress, respectively, in Old St. Peter's Basilica in Rome. Cnut the Great, King of Denmark and England, attends the coronation, proving his position as sole ruler of the Danish North Sea Empire.
 May 14 – King Robert II of France ("the Pious") sues for peace with his sons. Henry I is crowned co-king of France at Reims Cathedral, but has little power to rule (until 1031).
 August 6 – Robert the Magnificent becomes duke of Normandy after the death of his brother Richard III.
 Duke Sergius IV of Naples donates the County of Aversa to a band of Norman mercenaries led by Rainulf Drengot, who support him in the war with Capua.
 King Sigtrygg Silkbeard of Dublin and sub-King Flannacán of Brega make a pilgrimage to Rome.
 Ealdred is appointed abbot of Tavistock Abbey in England (approximate date).

 Asia 
 August 16 – Bagrat IV becomes king of Georgia on the death of his father, George I. Queen Dowager Mariam becomes regent for her 9-year-old son.
 Wedding of Crown Prince Atsunaga of Japan and Imperial Princess Teishi.
 This is the first year of the first rabjyung (60-year) cycle to start in the Tibetan calendar.

 By topic 
 Science, technology and medicine 
 The Book of Healing (Arabic: کتاب الشفاء  Kitab Al-Shifaʾ, Latin: Sufficientia), a comprehensive scientific and philosophical encyclopedia written by the Persian polymath Avicenna (Abū ʿAlī ibn Sīnā), is published.
 Song dynasty Chinese engineer Yan Su reinvents the 3rd-century south-pointing chariot, a mechanical-driven compass vehicle (as recorded in the Song Shi).

Births 
 January 19 – Shōshi, Japanese empress consort (d. 1105)
 Albert III, count of Namur (House of Namur) (approximate date)
 Al-Mu'tamid ibn Abbad, Abbadid ruler of Seville (d. 1095)
 Ernest the Brave, margrave of Austria (d. 1075)
 Fayun Faxiu, Chinese Chan Buddhist monk (d. 1090)
 Matilda of Franconia, German princess (d. 1034)
 Sviatoslav II, Grand Prince of Kiev (d. 1077)
 Ulrich I (or Udalrich), German bishop (d. 1121)

Deaths 
 January 3 – Fujiwara no Yukinari, Japanese calligrapher (b. 972)
 August 6 – Richard III, duke of Normandy (House of Normandy)
 August 16 – George I, king of Georgia (House of Bagrationi)
 October 16 – Fujiwara no Kenshi, Japanese dowager empress (b. 994)
 Abu'l-Qasim al-Husayn ibn Ali al-Maghribi, Arab statesman (b. 981)
 Aurelia of Regensburg, daughter of Hugh Capet and saint
 Dayang Jingxuan, Chinese Zen Buddhist monk (b. 943)
 Dogra mac Dúnadach, king of Síol Anmchadha (Ireland)
 Gadhra Mór mac Dundach, king of Uí Maine (Ireland)
 Hippolytus, archbishop of Gniezno (approximate date)
 Walter of Speyer, German bishop and poet (b. 967)
 Yazid II, Persian ruler (shah) of Shirvan (Azerbaijan)

References